Maguindanao del Norte, officially the Province of Maguindanao del Norte (Jawi: دايرت نو ڤڠوترن ماڬينداناو; , ڤروبنسيا ا ڤڠوترن ماڬينداناو), is a province in the Philippines located in the Bangsamoro Autonomous Region in Muslim Mindanao in Mindanao. Its capital is the municipality of Datu Odin Sinsuat. It borders Cotabato province to the east, Lanao del Sur to the north, Maguindanao del Sur to the south-east, and Sultan Kudarat to the south.

The province's largest city, Cotabato City is administratively independent from the province but is grouped for congressional representation.

History

The idea of creating a province in the present territory of Maguindanao del Norte dates back to 2006 when the province of Shariff Kabunsuan briefly existed for two years before being reverted as part of Maguindanao.

Present
Maguindanao del Norte was formed when Maguindanao province was split into two provinces; the other province being Maguindanao del Sur. The division occurred following a plebiscite on September 17, 2022 which ratified Republic Act 11550 wherein it proposed the partitioning of the province. Former Maguindanao Vice Governor Ainee Sinsuat was expected to become the acting governor of the newly formed Maguindanao del Norte province. However an issue arose since the determination of the first set of officials of the province presumes that the plebiscite was held prior to the 2022 national and local elections. However the plebiscite was postponed to a date after the elections. This led to the Commission on Elections to come up with a legal opinion. The position was issued on September 28, 2022, where the election body conclude that only the Department of the Interior and Local Government could appoint the first officials of the province.

Sinsuat took oath as the first governor of the province on October 13, 2022 with former Maguindanao provincial board member Sharifudin Mastura as her vice governor. A transition period would take place until January 9, 2023.

Geography

Maguindanao del Norte is composed of 1 independent city, 12 municipalities, and 1 legislative district.

Demographics

References

 
Provinces of the Philippines
Provinces of Bangsamoro
States and territories established in 2022
2022 establishments in the Philippines